Devon McKenney (born September 14, 1984 in North Olmsted, Ohio) is an American soccer player.

Career

College and Amateur
McKenney attended North Olmsted High School, helping them to the conference and district championships his senior season, with no losses throughout the season, and being named to the first-team All-Southwestern Conference, All-Greater Cleveland, All-Ohio and All-Central United States in 2002. He played college soccer at the University of Akron, where he was named to the All-MAC Second Team as a junior. During his college years he also played with Bradenton Academics in the USL Premier Development League.

Professional
McKenney spent 2008 with the Columbus Crew reserves, playing in the MLS Reserve Division, but never being called up to the senior team. He caught the eye of Carolina RailHawks head coach Martin Rennie during the 2009 pre-season, and was signed to a professional contract on April 1, 2009. He made his professional debut on April 11, 2009, in the Railhawks' season opener against Minnesota Thunder.

References

External links
Carolina RailHawks bio
Akron Zips profile

1984 births
Living people
Akron Zips men's soccer players
American soccer players
IMG Academy Bradenton players
North Carolina FC players
Real Maryland F.C. players
USL First Division players
USL League Two players
USL Second Division players
USSF Division 2 Professional League players
North American Soccer League players
Association football defenders